William L. Nash is a retired major general in the U.S. Army who commanded the 1st Armored Division when it went to Bosnia in 1995 as the bulk of Multi-National Division (North) for a year as part of the Implementation Force (IFOR). A Russian brigade, initially under the command of Colonel Aleksandr Ivanovich Lentsov, was part of that effort. General Nash is a frequent contributor to ABCNEWS.

He stated in 2006 that he believes a civil war is taking place in Iraq.

He is a retired visiting lecturer in the Woodrow Wilson School of Public and International Affairs at Princeton University.

References

External links
William L. Nash-US Department of Defense official information page

United States Army generals
Recipients of the Distinguished Service Medal (US Army)
Recipients of the Silver Star
Recipients of the Legion of Merit
Living people
Year of birth missing (living people)